The Belarusian Congress Committee of America or BCCA is a non-partisan not-for-profit national umbrella organization uniting different national Belarusian American organizations in advocating for Americans of Belarusian descent. Its membership is composed of fraternal, educational, veterans, religious, cultural, social, business, political and humanitarian organizations, as well as individuals. Established in 1951 in South River, New Jersey, the BCCA maintains local all-volunteer chapters across the United States. The magazine "Belaruskaya Dumka" is the official periodical of the Belarusian Congress Committee of America.

Presidents 
 Mikalai Shchors (11.02.1951—30.06.1957)
 Ivan Kasiak (30.06.1957—13.03.1989)
 Russell Zavistovich (02.06.1990—20.12.2000)
 Robert Usevalad Tsupryk (2001—2021)

See also 
 Belarusan-American Association
 Belarusian Council of Orthodox Churches in North America

References

Belarusian-American history
1951 establishments in New Jersey